Karmėlava   is a small town in Kaunas County in central Lithuania. In 2011 it had a population of 1,395.

History
Karmėlava is one of the oldest settlements in Lithuania. Karmelava Estate was mentioned since the late 15th century. The first church in Karmėlava was built in 1529. Grand Duchess of Lithuania Barbora Radvilaitė became the governor of Karmėlava and its environs in 1549. Later, Karmėlava was governed by noble families of Pac, Ogiński, and Sirutis. The parish first school in Karmėlava was mentioned in 1663. Karmėlava was devastated during the Northern Wars. The town of Karmėlava was granted the Magdeburg rights and the coat of arms in 1792.

References
This article was initially translated from the Lithuanian Wikipedia.

External links

 Karmėlava Balys Buračas Secondary School website

Towns in Kaunas County